Howard Cornelius Gentry Sr. (April 15, 1921 – February 14, 1995) was an American football coach.  He was the 12th head football coach at Tennessee A&I State College—now known as Tennessee State University—in Nashville, Tennessee, serving for six seasons, from 1955 until 1960, and compiling a record of 42–10–1.   Gentry  as also the athletic director at Tennessee State from 1961 to 1976.

Gentry played college football as a tackle at Florida A&M University under head coached William M. Bell and Jake Gaither. His coaching career began at North Carolina A&T University under Bell and was then an assistant coach at Wilberforce State College—now known as Central State University—in Wilberforce, Ohio under head coach Gaston F. Lewis. Gentry moved to Tennessee A&I in 1949 to become and assistant football coach under Henry Kean.

Head coaching record

References

External links
 

1921 births
1995 deaths
American football tackles
Central State Marauders football coaches
Florida A&M Rattlers football players
North Carolina A&T Aggies football coaches
Tennessee State Tigers and Lady Tigers athletic directors
Tennessee State Tigers football coaches
Sportspeople from Columbus, Ohio
African-American coaches of American football
African-American players of American football
African-American college athletic directors in the United States
20th-century African-American sportspeople
Players of American football from Columbus, Ohio